The Denmark national cricket team played its first match in 1954 against Oxford University. They have appeared in thirty-one List A matches. From 1999 to 2005, Denmark were permitted to take part in the English domestic one-day competition, in which they made two NatWest Trophy and four Cheltenham & Gloucester Trophy appearances. The players in this list have all played at least one List A match. Danish cricketers who have not represented the county in List A cricket are excluded from the list.

Players are listed in order of appearance, where players made their debut in the same match, they are ordered by batting order. Players in bold represented Denmark as permitted overseas players when Denmark participated in the English domestic one-day competition.

Key

List of players

List A captains

See also
 Denmark national cricket team

References

External links 
 List A matches played by Denmark at CricketArchive

Denmark in international cricket

Denmark
Cricketers